Memphis to New York Spirit is an album by American organist John Patton recorded in 1969 and 1970 but not released on the Blue Note label until 1996.

Reception

The Allmusic review by Stephen Thomas Erlewine awarded the album 3½ stars and stated "Memphis to New York Spirit doesn't have a consistent groove like some other Patton records, but when it does click, the results are remarkable; it's worthy addition to a funky soul-jazz collection".

Track listing
All compositions by John Patton except where noted
 "Memphis" - 5:55 
 "Footprints" (Wayne Shorter) - 6:24 
 "The Mandingo" (Marvin Cabell) - 7:50 
 "Bloodyun" (James Blood Ulmer) - 8:20 
 "Steno" - 9:10 
 "Man from Tanganyika" (McCoy Tyner) - 6:10 
 "Cissy Strut" (Art Neville, Ziggy Modeliste, Leo Nocentelli, George Porter Jr.) - 6:55 
 "Dragon Slayer" (Cabell) - 6:35 
Recorded at Rudy Van Gelder Studio, Englewood Cliffs, New Jersey on June 9, 1969 (tracks 6-8) and October 2, 1970 (tracks 1-5).

Personnel
Big John Patton - organ
Marvin Cabell -  tenor saxophone, soprano saxophone, flute 
George Coleman - tenor saxophone (tracks 6–8) 
James Blood Ulmer - guitar (tracks 1–5)
Leroy Williams - drums

References

Blue Note Records albums
John Patton (musician) albums
1996 albums
Albums produced by Michael Cuscuna